Terra Nova is an action film, directed by Aleksandr Melnik and released in 2008. The film stars Konstantin Lavronenko, Andrei Feskov, Marat Basharov, Pavel Sborshchikov, Sergei Zhigunov, Aleksandr Samoylenko, Tommy 'Tiny' Lister and Ingeborga Dapkunaite. It was filmed in Russia, Ukraine, Malta and Norway.

Plot
In 2013, capital punishment has been abolished.  With prison spaces running out, a group of prisoners are taken to an island called Novaya Zemlya for the sake of an experiment.

Cast
 Konstantin Lavronenko as Zhilin
 Andrei Feskov as Sipa
 Marat Basharov as Tolya
 Pavel Sborshchikov as Obezyan
 Sergei Zhigunov as Colonel
 Aleksandr Samoylenko as Ali
 Tommy 'Tiny' Lister as Sewing Dude
 Ingeborga Dapkunaite as Marta
 Sergey Koltakov as Makhov
 Evgeny Titov as Moryak
 Vladislav Abashin as Arzhanov
 Zaza Chichinadze as Amurbek
 Viktor Zhalsanov as Yakut
 Nikolai Stotsky as Volynets
 Igor Pismenniy as Olafson

External links 
 

2008 films
Russian dystopian films
Russian action thriller films
Films set in 2013
Films shot in Russia
Films shot in Ukraine
Films shot in Malta
Films shot in Norway